Paul Joseph Brady (born 19 May 1947) is an Irish singer-songwriter and musician from Strabane, Northern Ireland. His work straddles folk and pop. He was interested in a wide variety of music from an early age. 

Initially popular for playing Irish traditional music in a duo with Andy Irvine and later with Tommy Peoples and Matt Molloy, he later turned to a more rock-inspired electric style with poignant political lyrics. Some of his most popular songs are: "Crazy Dreams", "Nothing but the Same Old Story", "The Island", "Night Hunting Time", "Steel Claw" and "Paradise Is Here".

Early life
Paul Joseph Brady was born in Belfast and raised in the small town of Strabane in County Tyrone, Northern Ireland, on the border with County Donegal, Republic of Ireland. His father Seán Brady and mother Mollie Brady née McElholm were school teachers. Brady was educated at Sion Mills Primary School, St. Columb's College, Derry and University College Dublin. He is prominently featured in the documentary film The Boys of St. Columb's.

He began learning piano around age six and by the age of eleven he had begun to play guitar, spending hours of his school holidays learning every song that the Shadows had recorded. He was also strongly influenced by Chuck Berry.

In 1963, Brady began performing as a piano player in a hotel in Bundoran, Donegal. In October 1964, he attended University College Dublin and performed with a string of RnB groups, covering songs by the likes of Ray Charles and James Brown. The first of these was the Inmates (late 1964–about April 1965), which evolved into the Kult (about April–December 1965), featuring Brady, Jackie McAuley (ex-Them, and future Belfast Gypsies and Trader Horne), Brendan Bonass, and Dave Pennefather. Brady can be seen in the documentary film Charlie Is My Darling waiting outside Dublin's Adelphi Theatre for the Rolling Stones' concert of 3 September 1965. He next joined Rootzgroup (late 1965–May 1966) and Rockhouse (about May–December 1966).

Musical career

1960s and 1970s
During his time at college in Dublin, the country saw a huge rise in interest in traditional Irish music. Brady joined the popular Irish band The Johnstons when Michael Johnston left in May 1967. They moved to London, England, in 1969 and subsequently to New York City in 1972 to expand their audience. Despite some success, Brady returned to Ireland in 1974 to join the Irish group Planxty, the band that would subsequently launch the solo careers of Andy Irvine, Liam O'Flynn, Dónal Lunny, and Christy Moore.

When Planxty disbanded in late 1975, Brady formed a duo with Irvine from 1976 to 1978, a partnership that produced the successful album, Andy Irvine/Paul Brady. The next few years saw him establish his popularity and reputation as one of Ireland's best interpreters of traditional songs. His versions of ballads like "Arthur McBride" and "The Lakes of Pontchartrain" were considered definitive and are still popular at concerts today. In 1975 in New York he recorded three albums for Shanachie Records as guitar accompanist to resident Irish fiddlers Andy McGann, Paddy Reynolds and John Vesey. He also recorded a 1976 album, The High Part of the Road, for the same label with Irish fiddler Tommy Peoples.

Solo career
In 1978, Brady released his first solo album, Welcome Here Kind Stranger, which won him critical acclaim and was awarded the Melody Maker Folk Album of the Year. However, it would prove to be Brady's last album covering traditional material. He decided to delve into pop and rock music, and released his first album of this genre in 1981, Hard Station.

Brady released a number of successful solo albums throughout the 1980s: True for You (1983), Back to the Centre (1985), and Primitive Dance (1987). By the end of the decade, Brady was recognised and accepted as a respected performer and songwriter. His songs were being covered by a number of other artists, including Santana and Dave Edmunds. 

When Tina Turner heard a demo of his song "Paradise Is Here", she recorded it for her Break Every Rule album of 1986. By now, he was a favourite songwriter among such artists as Bob Dylan and Bonnie Raitt, who would do a duet with Brady on his 1991 album, Trick or Treat. A couple of Brady songs soon appeared on Raitt's album Luck of the Draw, including the title track.

Dylan was sufficiently impressed by Brady's work to name-check him in the booklet of his 1985 box set, Biograph. The actual quote was "(...) people get too famous too fast these days and it destroys them. Some guys got it down-Leonard Cohen, Paul Brady, Lou Reed, secret heroes, John Prine, David Allen Coe, Tom Waits. I listen more to that kind of stuff than whatever is popular at the moment. They're not just witchdoctoring up the planet, they don't set up barriers (...)".

Since his Hard Station album (1981), Brady was on various major labels until he created his own label, PeeBee Music, in the late 1990s. He released three albums in the 1990s: Trick or Treat, Songs & Crazy Dreams (a remixed compilation of earlier songs) and Spirits Colliding, which were met with critical acclaim. Trick or Treat was on Fontana/Mercury Records and received a lot of promotion. As a result, some critics considered it his debut album and noted that the record benefited from the expertise of experienced studio musicians, as well as producer Gary Katz, who worked with the rock group Steely Dan. Rolling Stone, after praising Brady's earlier but less-known solo records, called Trick or Treat Brady's "most compelling collection."

Brady has gone on to record several other albums (15 in total since he went solo in 1978) and collaborated with a number of other established musicians including Bonnie Raitt and Richard Thompson (a complete list of his many collaborations is given at his website). In 2006, he collaborated with Cara Dillon on the track "The Streets of Derry" from her album After the Morning. He has also worked with Fiachra Trench.

He performed Gaelic songs as a character in the 2002 Matthew Barney film Cremaster 3. He also played tin whistle on the single "One" by Greg Pearle in 2008, from the album Beautiful You, a collaboration between Greg Pearle and John Illsley; this song featured in the 2008 film Anton, directed by Graham Cantwell.

Brady's fifteenth studio album, Hooba Dooba, was released in March 2010 and was widely acclaimed as one of his finest.

As of 2017, a friendship was struck with Theo Katzman (vulfpeck) and Brady toured Ireland in 2019 as half of this unlikely duo with Joe Dart, also of vulfpeck, Louis Cato and Lee Pardini.

Brady continues to tour, record and collaborate in a variety of creative projects around the globe.  In 2019 Jimmy Buffett began performing a cover of Brady's hit, The World is What you Make It. In September 2019 Brady joined Jimmy Buffett on his tour stops in both Dublin and London.

He released the album ‘Unfinished Business’on his own label PeeBee Music licensed to Proper Music UK IN 2017

Brady and Andy Irvine planned to tour their 1976 album Andy Irvine, Paul Brady in 2017 but many of the dates were rescheduled due to the Covid pandemic. In 2022 they managed to finish the tour, taking in dates in Castlebar; Belfast; Dublin and Perth, Scotland. Also joining them on the tour were the legendary fiddle player Kevin Burke and Donal Lunny, who both played on the original album.

Awards
In 2009, Brady received an honorary degree of Doctor of Letters from the University of Ulster, in recognition of his services to traditional Irish music and songwriting.

Discography

Solo studio albums
 Welcome Here Kind Stranger (1978)
 Hard Station (1981)
 True for You (1983)
 Back to the Centre (1985)
 Primitive Dance (1987)
 Trick or Treat (1991)
 Spirits Colliding (1995)
 Oh What a World (2000)
 Say What You Feel (2005)
 Hooba Dooba (2010)
 Unfinished Business (2017)
 Maybe So (2022)

Solo live albums
 Full Moon (1984)
 The Paul Brady Songbook (album and DVD) Live recordings for RTÉ TV series (2002)
 The Missing Liberty Tapes (2002) - Recorded Live at Liberty Hall, Dublin, 21 July 1978

Solo compilation albums
 Songs & Crazy Dreams (1992)
 Nobody Knows: The Best of Paul Brady (1999)
 Dancer in the Fire: A Paul Brady Anthology (2012)

With Andy Irvine
Andy Irvine/Paul Brady (1976)
Andy Irvine/70th Birthday Concert at Vicar St 2012 (2014)

With Tommy Peoples
The High Part of the Road (1975)

With Matt Molloy and Tommy Peoples
Molloy, Brady, Peoples (1977)

With Andy McGann and Paddy Reynolds
Fiddle Duet (1976)

With Andy McGann
 It's a Hard Road to Travel (1977)

With John Vesey
The First Month of Spring (1977)

With John Kavanagh and Sean O'Casey
The Green Crow Caws (1980)

With various artists
The Gathering (1981) Paul Brady, Peter Browne, Andy Irvine, Dónal Lunny, Matt Molloy, Tommy Potts, Tríona Ní Dhomhnaill (Brady plays on three tracks)
Feed The Folk (1985), Temple Records FTP01, ("The Green Fields Of Canada")
The Rough Guide to Irish Music (1996)

DVDs
 The Transatlantic Sessions Series 3 (2007) (various artists)
 The Paul Brady Songbook (2002)
 Paul Brady Live at Rockpalast 1983 (Repertoire Records 2016)

References

External links
Paul Brady homepage

Immortal Jukebox article on Paul Brady

1947 births
Folk singers from Northern Ireland
Singer-songwriters from Northern Ireland
Mandolinists from Northern Ireland
Bouzouki players from Northern Ireland
Guitarists from Northern Ireland
Irish male guitarists
Living people
Male singers from Northern Ireland
People from Strabane
People educated at St Columb's College
Planxty members
Musicians from County Tyrone
Mercury Records artists
Shanachie Records artists
Fontana Records artists
Rykodisc artists
Proper Records artists
Claddagh Records artists
Green Linnet Records artists